John Raimondi (born May, 1948) is an American sculptor best known as a creator of monumental public sculpture, with works throughout the United States and several European countries. He lives and works in Palm Beach Gardens, Florida.

Biography
The first of four sons born to Erma and Peter Raimondi, John Raimondi was born in May 1948. John Raimondi spent his early years honing his skills while developing an eye for the beauty of nature that surrounded him. The young artist spent much of his time in the company of his family, though he also enjoyed the solitude of drawing and painting, as well as collecting coins and building model airplanes.

In his formative years, Raimondi became fascinated by scale-model automobiles and airplanes, which later translated into full-size "hot rods" as he grew into a teenager. These hobbies proved invaluable in the artist's keen ability to comprehend scale and movement—two of the elements that are so essential in his work today.

Originally intending to become a seascape painter, Raimondi first attended Vesper George School of Art and subsequently attended the Portland School of Fine and Applied Arts in Maine (now Maine College of Art). There he met teacher and sculptor Norman Therrien who encouraged Raimondi to try sculpture. Next, Raimondi attended the Massachusetts College of Art where he studied sculpture. 
He exhibited early works at Boston City Hall, Bridgewater State University, and numerous local galleries and museums. This led to Raimondi's first prominent commission, awarded to him in a national competition conducted by the I-80 Bicentennial Sculpture Project, in Nebraska. This sculpture, entitled Erma's Desire, is named for the artist's mother and her intense desire for the happiness of her children.
Located in Grand Island, Nebraska, the work was considered controversial due to its suggestive title and abstract form. It was debated fiercely in several major publications and on the TV news program "60 Minutes," catapulting Raimondi into the national spotlight. Since then, Raimondi has completed more than 100 monumental sculptures for public, corporate, and private collections worldwide.

He currently resides in Palm Beach Gardens, Florida.

Art forgery suit
Raimondi has sued billionaire Igor Olenicoff for art forgery. In a similar case, Olenicoff and his real estate company, Olen Properties Corp., were found guilty of copyright infringement by a federal jury in 2014 and ordered to pay $450,000 in damages to sculptor Don Wakefield, for art forgery.  
 Raimondi had been contacted by the real estate tycoon to create versions of two of his extant sculptures as part of a percent for art mandate for property developers.  Raimondi had supplied Olenicoff with detailed drawings and photographs of the proposed works, which Olenicof subsequently cancelled. In 2015, Olenicoff was ordered to pay Raimondi $650,000, according to a Benjamin Sutton article in Hyperallergic.com.

If Olenicoff had followed through with commissioning the works, Raimondi would have made $250,000 for each of the four proposed pieces.  In 2010, Raimondi was informed that sculptures that originally had been submitted to the city of Brea, California as being his works were now credited to a Chinese artist. Raimondi had never authorized the creation or display of the sculptures he had discussed with Olenicoff.

Gallery

Selected museums, public collections, and exhibitions
 Addison Gallery of American Art, Phillips Academy, Andover, Massachusetts
 Allen Memorial Art Museum, Oberlin College, Oberlin, Ohio
 Arvida / J M B Corporation, Boca Raton, Florida
 International Sculpture Garden, Hagenbrunn, Austria
 Bank of America, Miami, Florida & Stuart, Florida
 Bass Museum of Art, Miami Beach, Florida
 Blue Cross/Blue Shield, Milwaukee, WI and Baltimore, Maryland
 Boca Raton Museum of Art, Florida
 Bridgewater State University, Massachusetts
 Butler Institute of American Art, Youngstown, Ohio
 Cabot, Cabot & Forbes, Cambridge, Massachusetts
 Cape Ann Museum, Gloucester, Massachusetts
 Centenary College of Louisiana, Shreveport, Louisiana
 Charles R. Wood Theater, Glens Falls, New York
 Civic League Rose Garden, San Angelo, Texas
 The Colony Group, Boston, Massachusetts
 Columbus Museum of Art, Ohio
 Currier Museum of Art, Manchester, New Hampshire
 The Dalad Group, Independence, Ohio
 DeCordova Museum and Sculpture Park, Lincoln, Massachusetts
 Everson Museum of Art, Syracuse, New York
 Federal Reserve Bank, Boston, Massachusetts
 Glaxo Pharmaceuticals, Uxbridge, England
 Herbert F. Johnson Museum of Art, Cornell University, Ithaca, New York
 Hobart & William Smith Colleges, Geneva, New York
 The Hyde Collection, Glens Falls, New York
 L.C. Bates Museum, Hinckley, Maine
 Leonard M. Miller School of Medicine, Miami, Florida
 McGladrey Co, Charlestown, Massachusetts
 Metro Atlanta Chamber of Commerce, Atlanta, Georgia
 Milwaukee Art Museum, Wisconsin
 Museum of Fine Arts, Boston, Massachusetts
 Museum of Nebraska Art, Kearney, Nebraska
 Newark Museum, New Jersey
 Norton Museum of Art, West Palm Beach, Florida
 Northfield Mount Hermon School, Massachusetts
 Museum of Art Fort Lauderdale, Florida
 Oklahoma City Museum of Art, Oklahoma
 Olen Properties, Newport Beach, California
 Omaha Eppley Airfield, Nebraska
 Peabody Essex Museum, Salem, Massachusetts
 Peoria Riverfront Museum, Illinois
 Portland Museum of Art, Maine
 Provincetown Art Association and Museum, Massachusetts
 Rockport Art Association, Massachusetts
 San Angelo Museum of Fine Arts, Texas
 Sheldon Museum of Art, Lincoln, Nebraska
 Southwest Florida International Airport, Fort Myers, Florida
 Smithsonian American Art Museum, Washington, D.C.
 Stanhope PLC for Stockley Park, London, England
 Steelcase Corporation, Grand Rapids, Michigan
 Tampa Museum of Art, Florida
 Temple Emanu-El, Miami Beach, Florida
 The Society for the Four Arts, Palm Beach, Florida
 University of Nebraska, Kearney, Nebraska
 University of Richmond, Virginia
 University of St. Thomas, St. Paul, Minnesota
 Wells Fargo Bank, Palm Beach, Florida

Exhibitions
 San Angelo Museum of Fine Arts, Texas
 College of Central Florida, Appleton Museum of Art, Ocala, Florida
 Boca Raton Museum of Art, Florida – "Drawing to Sculpture,"
 John H. Surovek Gallery, Palm Beach, Florida
 Harmon-Meek Gallery, Naples, Florida, Jazz Series,
 Tadu Contemporary Art, Santa Fe, New Mexico
 Pinnacle Gallery, Savannah College of Art and Design, Savannah, Georgia – "Jazz"
 Gary Snyder Fine Art, New York, New York, Jazz Series
 Forum Gallery, Los Angeles, California, Jazz Series
 Butler Institute of American Art, Youngstown, Ohio
 National Academy Museum, New York, New York
 Wichita Art Museum, Wichita, Kansas
 Cypress Gardens, Florida – "Wildlife Sculpture Series III", 
 "Community of Creativity: A Century of MacDowell Colony Artist's, Currier Museum of Art, Manchester, New Hampshire
 Harmon Meek Gallery, Naples, Florida
 Tiffany & Co., Palm Beach, Florida
 "Romantic Abstraction: A 20-Year Survey of Works by John Raimondi”, Traveling exhibit: Court House Cultural Center, Stuart, Florida; Center For the Arts, Vero Beach, Florida; The Hyde Collection, Glens Falls, New York
 “Stars In Florida”, Museum of Art, Ft. Lauderdale, Florida
 O'Farrell Gallery, Brunswick, Maine
 Dolly Fiterman Fine Art, Minneapolis, Minnesota
 C. Grimaldis Gallery, Baltimore, Maryland
 Michael H. Lord Gallery, Milwaukee, Wisconsin
 Hokin Gallery, Palm Beach, Florida
 Wallace Wentworth Gallery, Washington D.C.
 Gucci, Palm Beach, Florida
 Arlene McDaniel Galleries, Outdoor sculptures, Simsbury, Connecticut
 Judith N. Wolov Gallery, Boston, Massachusetts
 "Dance of the Cranes: Evolutionary Drawings", Joslyn Art Museum, Omaha, Nebraska
 "Art Against AIDS", Graham Modern Gallery, New York, New York
 "87 – Contemporary Sculpture at Chesterwood", Stockbridge, Massachusetts
 "Lupus: Evolutionary Drawings", Lotus Development Corp., Cambridge, Massachusetts
 Virginia Miller Galleries, Coral Gables, Florida
 Tiffany & Co., Boston, Massachusettsa
 Academy of the Arts, Easton, Maryland
 McNay Art Museum, San Antonio, Texas
 Graham Modern Gallery, New York, New York
 Dolly Fiterman Gallery, Minneapolis, Minnesota
 National Museum of American Art, Washington D.C., "New Accessions”
 Milwaukee Art Museum, Wisconsin
 Sunne Savage Gallery, Boston, Massachusetts
 Sheldon Memorial Art Gallery, Lincoln, NE, "Interstate 80 Sculptors"
 Brockton Art Center – Fuller Memorial, Massachusetts
 Boston City Hall, Massachusetts

References

Further reading
Corbett, William. John Raimondi: Sculptor (Hudson Hills Press, 1999) 
Henry Adams (author) & Irvin Lippman (foreword). John Raimondi: Drawing to Sculpture (George F Thompson Publishing, 2016)

External links
John Raimondi's Website Comprehensive listing of every sculpture created by John Raimondi chronologically in addition to his art collection.
John Raimondi: Drawing to Sculpture John Raimondi's solo exhibition at the Boca Raton Museum of Art. 
International Sculpture Center website artist page provides info on Museum collections, public collections, and exhibitions
John Raimondi 1987 Newspaper Review discusses a sculpture entitled Aquila, located in Miami, FL and described as "one of the largest bronze sculpture in North America".
Miami History, Aquila in Brickell, Miami describes Raimondi's sculpture Aquila in Miami, FL.
Dance of the Cranes in Omaha, Nebraska describes Raimondi's sculpture Dance of the Cranes in Eppley Airfield.
John Raimondi's Gallery Website A collection showcasing the various art that John Raimondi has collected over the last 40 years.
Forbes Article Billionaire Olenicoff Admits to Copying Sculptor's Work. 
Hyperallergenic Article "Billionaire Must Pat Sculptor for Unauthorized Copies, but He Gets to Keep Them" by Benjamin Sutton
 

1948 births
Living people
Massachusetts College of Art and Design alumni
20th-century American sculptors
20th-century American male artists
21st-century American sculptors
21st-century American male artists
American male sculptors